American singer Katy Perry has released two video albums and has appeared in various music videos, films, television shows, and television commercials. After appearing in several music videos between 2004 and 2007, including "Goodbye for Now" and "Cupid's Chokehold", a video for "Ur So Gay" was released to introduce her to the music industry. In 2008, she released videos for "I Kissed a Girl" and "Hot n Cold", both taken from her second album One of the Boys. Videos for "Thinking of You" and "Waking Up in Vegas" were released the following year.

Perry's third album Teenage Dream (2010) spawned the single "California Gurls", whose music video is set in the fictional land of "Candyfornia" and features rapper Snoop Dogg. The Yoann Lemoine-directed video "Teenage Dream" depicts her as a euphoric teenager. Her "Firework" video is based on self-empowerment, and won the MTV Video Music Award for Video of the Year. The video for "E.T." takes place in outer space, and features rapper Kanye West. Perry also released "Last Friday Night (T.G.I.F.)"—a video based on a hangover after a house party—and "The One That Got Away"—which focuses on flashbacks of days with a deceased lover. In 2012, she reissued her third album as Teenage Dream: The Complete Confection, and also released videos for the singles "Part of Me" and "Wide Awake". The following year, Perry released her fourth studio album Prism, with "Roar" as its lead single, whose music video features her in a jungle after a plane crash. The video for her next single, "Unconditionally", is based on unconditional love. In the "Birthday" video, she impersonates five different characters to entertain at birthday parties. She became the first artist to have multiple videos, "Dark Horse" and "Roar", each gain one billion views on Vevo. Perry's fifth album Witness spawned music videos for the songs "Chained to the Rhythm", "Bon Appétit", "Swish Swish", and "Hey Hey Hey". She has 23 vevo certified videos, including for Roar, Last Friday Night, E.T., Never Really Over and Wide Awake. 2 videos have over 3 billion views and a further 3 have over a billion views. 

In addition to her music videos, Perry has voiced Smurfette in The Smurfs (2011) and its sequel The Smurfs 2 (2013). Her autobiographical documentary Katy Perry: Part of Me (2012) follows her through the California Dreams Tour and the breakdown of her marriage to comedian Russell Brand. In the United States, the film is the eighth highest-grossing documentary of all time. She has appeared in television shows, including in guest judging roles in American Idol and The X Factor, as well as hosting Saturday Night Live in December 2011. Perry has additionally starred in episodes for the television shows How I Met Your Mother, Raising Hope, and The Simpsons, and won the People's Choice Award for Favorite TV Guest Star for her appearance in How I Met Your Mother. Perry also starred in a four-day long livestream event on YouTube in 2017 titled Katy Perry Live: Witness World Wide. Perry was also featured in the music video for Taylor Swift's "You Need to Calm Down" in June 2019.

Music videos

Guest appearances

Video albums

Filmography

Films

Television

Commercials

Web

References

Footnotes

Sources

External links 
Katy Perry's official Vevo channel on YouTube

Videography
Videographies of American artists
Actress filmographies
American filmographies